Hamwolsan is a mountain bordering Seonam Lake Park in Nam-gu, Ulsan, South Korea.

See also
Geography of Korea
List of mountains in Korea
List of mountains by elevation
Mountain portal
South Korea portal

References

Mountains of Ulsan
Mountains of South Gyeongsang Province
Nam District, Ulsan
Mountains of South Korea